Ko Taku Reo: Deaf Education New Zealand is located in Archibald Road, New Lynn, Auckland, New Zealand. It is a residential special school for deaf children, as well as a resource centre providing services and support for mainstream students and their teachers in the Upper North Island (north of and including Taupo).

The Kelston School for the Deaf was established in 1958, as the Kelston School for Deaf Children. It replaced the schools for the deaf at Mount Wellington and Lopdell House in Titirangi. It changed its name to Kelston Deaf Education Centre in 1991 to better reflect the wide range of services it provided. At the start of the third term of 2020 the school merged with the Van Asch Deaf Education Centre to form Ko Taku Reo, a national school for Deaf Education.

References 

Schools for the deaf in New Zealand
Whau Local Board Area
Schools in Auckland
Special schools in New Zealand
Educational institutions established in 1958
1958 establishments in New Zealand
Schools in West Auckland, New Zealand